Atylotus rusticus is a species of horse-flies in the genus Atylotus. It is found in  Europe, Asia and North Africa. 

Atylotus rusticus belongs to the group of insects known as Endopterygota (holometabolising insects), which go through metamorphosis during their life. The larvae are radically different from the full-grown insects. Between the larval stage and the grown stage is a pupal stage, where the fly's inner and outer organs develop.

References

External links
 Norsk Entomologisk forening - to learn more about insects.

Tabanidae
Diptera of Europe
Insects described in 1767
Taxa named by Carl Linnaeus